This is an episode list of the ITV television drama series Wild At Heart. It stars Stephen Tompkinson, Amanda Holden, Lucy-Jo Hudson, Deon Stewardson, Hayley Mills, Dawn Steele, Luke Ward-Wilkinson, Rafaella Hutchinson, Olivia Scott-Taylor, Mary-Ann Barlow, Robert Bathurst, and Jill Halfpenny.

Series overview

Episodes

Series 1 (2006)

Series 2 (2007)

Series 3 (2008)

Series 4 (2009)

Series 5 (2010)

Series 6 (2011)

Series 7 (2012)

External links

References

Wild at Heart